
 
 

Karte Conservation Park (formerly Karte National Park) is a protected area located in the Australian state of South Australia in the localities of Karte and Parilla about  east of the state capital of Adelaide and about  north-west of the town of Pinnaroo.

The conservation park consists of crown land in sections 3, 4 and 10 in the cadastral unit of the Hundred of Kingsford and section 135 in the Hundred of Parilla. It acquired protected area status as the "Karte National Park" on 4 September 1969 by proclamation under the National Parks Act 1966. On 27 April 1972, it was reconstituted as the Karte Conservation Park upon the proclamation of the National Parks and Wildlife Act 1972. Land in section 10 of the Hundred of Kingsford was added on 7 December 1972 and in Section 135 of the Hundred of Parilla was added on 17 June 1976.

In 1980, it was described as follows:This park contains a discrete area of steep, irregular sand dunes supporting very mature mallee vegetation. The park provides habitat for numerous mallee species including the threatened mallee fowl… Dominant vegetation is tall, dense Eucalyptus incrassata mallee with Melaleuca lanceolata, M. uncinate and Callitris verrucosa. This park has been minimally disturbed despite disturbed natural and cultural surrounds. However pest mammals including the fox, rabbit and house mouse are present. The park has remained unburnt for a considerable time.

The conservation park is classified as an IUCN Category Ia protected area. In 1980, it was listed on the now-defunct Register of the National Estate.

See also
Protected areas of South Australia

References

External links
Karte Conservation Park webpage on the Protected Planet website
Karte Conservation Park webpage on the BirdsSA website

Conservation parks of South Australia
Protected areas established in 1969
1969 establishments in Australia
South Australian places listed on the defunct Register of the National Estate